The 2015 2000 Guineas Stakes was the 207th running of the 2000 Guineas Stakes horse race. It was run over one mile at Newmarket Racecourse on 2 May 2015. With the favourite going off at 4/1, this was the most open renewal since 2007 where Adagio headed the field at the same price. Most of the winter ante-post market leaders met the starter at Newmarket - notable absentees being Faydhan, who disappointed in the Free Handicap, and Highland Reel who was diverted to France.

Race details
 Sponsor: QIPCO
 Winner's prize money: £282,841
 Going: Good to Firm
 Number of runners: 18
 Winner's time: 1 minute, 37.55 seconds

Full result

* The distances between the horses are shown in lengths or shorter – nk = neck

Winner details
Further details of the winner, Gleneagles:

 Foaled: 12 January 2012, in Ireland
 Sire: Galileo; Dam: You'resothrilling (Storm Cat)
 Owner: Michael Tabor, Susan Magnier & Derrick Smith
 Breeder: Aidan O'Brien

Form analysis

Two-year-old races
Notable runs by the future 2000 Guineas participants as two-year-olds in 2014:
 Cappella Sansevero - 1st Marble Hill Stakes, 2nd Coventry Stakes, 3rd Phoenix Stakes, 1st Round Tower Stakes
 Celestial Path - 3rd Racing Post Trophy
 Code Red - 1st Scott Dobson Memorial Doncaster Stakes
 Dutch Connection - 1st Acomb Stakes, 3rd Vincent O'Brien National Stakes
 Estidhkaar - 1st Superlative Stakes, 1st Champagne Stakes
 Gleneagles - 1st Tyros Stakes, 1st Futurity Stakes, 1stVincent O'Brien National Stakes, 1st (placed 3rd) Prix Jean-Luc Lagardère
 Home Of The Brave - 3rd Sirenia Stakes
 Ivawood - 1st July Stakes, 1st Richmond Stakes, 2nd Middle Park Stakes 
 Kool Kompany - 1st Rochestown Stakes, 1st Railway Stakes, 1st Prix Robert Papin, 2nd Phoenix Stakes
 Ol' Man River - 1st Beresford Stakes
 Room Key - 3rd Vintage Stakes
 Territories - 3rd Prix La Rochette, 2nd Prix Jean-Luc Lagardère

The road to Newmarket
Early-season appearances in 2013, prior to running in the 2000 Guineas:
 Estidhkaar - 2nd Greenham Stakes
 Home Of The Brave - 1st European Free Handicap
 Ivawood - 3rd Greenham Stakes
 Kool Kompany - 1st Craven Stakes
 Moheet - 3rd Craven Stakes
 Ride Like The Wind - 1st Prix Djebel
 Territories - 1st Prix de Fontainebleau

Subsequent Group 1 wins
Group 1 / Grade I victories after running in the 2000 Guineas:
 Gleneagles - Irish 2,000 Guineas (2015), St James's Palace Stakes (2015)
 Territories - Prix Jean Prat (2015)

Subsequent breeding careers
Leading progeny of participants in the 2015 2000 Guineas Stakes.
Gleneagles (1st) - Royal Dornoch (1st Royal Lodge Stakes 2019), Royal Lytham - (1st July Stakes 2019)Ivawood (3rd) - Chares (1st Criterium de Lyon 2019)Territories (2nd) - Minor flat winnersEstidhkaar (14th) - Minor flat winnersOl' Man River (18th) - Offspring yet to raceKool Kompany (13th) - Exported to Spain

References

2000 Guineas
2000 Guineas
2000 Guineas
2000 Guineas
2010s in Suffolk
2000 Guineas Stakes